Seif Teka (born 20 April 1991), alternatively spelled Saïf Tka, is a Tunisian professional footballer who plays as a defender for Egyptian Premier League club Ceramica Cleopatra FC.

Career
After seven seasons with Club Africain, Teka signed with Ligue 2 club RC Lens on 28 July 2018. He made his professional debut with Lens in a 1–0 Coupe de la Ligue win over Tours FC on 14 August 2018.

Honours
Club Africain
 Tunisian Ligue Professionnelle 1: 2014–2015
 Tunisian Cup: 2016–17, 2017–18

References

External links
 

1991 births
Living people
Tunisian footballers
Footballers from Tunis
Association football defenders
Tunisian Ligue Professionnelle 1 players
Ligue 2 players
Championnat National 2 players
Egyptian Premier League players
RC Lens players
Club Africain players
CS Sfaxien players
US Monastir (football) players
CS Chebba players
Ceramica Cleopatra FC players
Tunisian expatriate footballers
Tunisian expatriate sportspeople in France
Expatriate footballers in France
Tunisian expatriate sportspeople in Egypt
Expatriate footballers in Egypt